The 2021 AAMI Community Series was the Australian Football League (AFL) pre-season competition played before the 2021 home and away season. The competition did not have a grand final or overall winner. All matches were televised live on Fox Footy as well as on the Kayo Sports app.

The series was originally set to feature 18 matches across three weekends, with each team playing twice. However in light of changing domestic border restrictions due to the COVID-19 pandemic, the series was reduced to one weekend in March 2021. Victorian clubs played each other, while non-Victorian clubs were originally scheduled to play opponents from neighbouring states. Clubs were free to schedule practice matches with other clubs from their own state beforehand, albeit with AFL approval.

The schedule was revised for a third time on February 25, 2021. All teams played pre-season games within their home state, to minimise travel before the season starts.

Results

References

AAMI Community Series
AAMI Community Series
Australian Football League pre-season competition